Razdan (Kashmiri: राज़दान) is a Kashmiri Pandit surname and clan that may refer to the royal or aristocratic bloodline of old Kashmir, mostly attributed to the warriors of the Kashmir Valley of Jammu and Kashmir, India. They are Saraswat Brahmins from the Kashmir Valley, belonging to the larger community of Pancha-Gauda Brahmins, and are widely known for their allegiance to Lord Shiva.

The census report of 1819 states that Razdan is a corrupted form of ancient Sanskrit epithet Rajanak. The title Rajanak, meaning literally "a king", used to be given to distinguished commanders for rendering their services to the King. “Razdan” was the title given to the Brahmin chieftains of warrior tribes who were Jaagirdaars of Chunks of Land in Kashmir during Persian rule.

They are the one of the High caste associated with Royal blood line of Kashmir and the Chenab Valley region of Jammu, where a big population of Kashmiris emigrated to. In Jammu, they are the inhabitants of Doda and Kishtwar regions. Their position was to maintain law and order in the region.
The evolution of the surname Razdan begins with its early ancestors who were bestowed upon with this title; mainly to denote the rank of a distinguished military commander, royal prince, high nobleman or a scholar. 

It is also said that they might also trace their lineage to the Kashyap gotra and are believed to be  Suryavanshis, the descendants of Lord Ram, equal to the rajputs of Jammu and other Pahadi rajputs.

Notable people 

 Karan Razdan (b, 1961) - an Indian actor, writer and director, who works in Bollywood
 Nidhi Razdan (b. 1977) - an Indian journalist and television personality.
 Rajni Razdan - was an Indian Administrative Service Officer of 1973 batch of Haryana cadre.
 Shefali Razdan Duggal (b.1971) -an Indian-born American political activist.
 Soni Razdan (b.1956) - a British actress and film director who works in Hindi films.
 Virendra Razdan (1950 – 2003) - was an Indian actor.
 Vivek Razdan (b. 1969) - a former Indian cricketer.

References

Surnames of Indian origin
Indian surnames
Kashmiri-language surnames
Kashmiri tribes
Hindu surnames